Antônio Drauzio Varella (born May 3, 1943 in São Paulo, Brazil) is a Brazilian doctor, educator, scientist and medical science popularizer in the press and TV, as well as best-selling author. In addition to medicine, Varella is a public commentator on issues such as prison conditions, social welfare, government, literature and his professed atheism and skepticism.

Varella came from a family of Portuguese and Spanish descent from São Paulo. He studied medicine at the Medical School of the University of São Paulo. While a student, he was one of the founders of a pre-med preparatory course with João Carlos di Genio and other colleagues, where he taught chemistry for several years. This course later became the largest private educational system in Brazil, the Universidade Paulista and the Sistema Objetivo. Varella received the  Prêmio Jabuti literary award in 2000 for his book Estação Carandiru.

Medical career
After graduation, he specialized in infectious diseases with Prof. Vicente Amato Neto, at the University of São Paulo and at the Hospital do Servidor Público de São Paulo. This work led him to develop an interest in immunology and in the last 20 years he worked at the Hospital do Câncer of São Paulo, specializing in oncology.

As a medical professor, he works at Universidade Paulista, but has taught also in several other institutions in Brazil and abroad, such as the Memorial Sloan Kettering Cancer Center, Cleveland Clinic, Karolinska Institute, Hiroshima University and the National Cancer Center of Japan. One of his main fields of works has been AIDS, specially the treatment of Kaposi's sarcoma. He has had an active role in prevention and educational campaigns about AIDS, being the first one to have a radio program on the subject. From 1989 to 2001 he volunteered to work as an unpaid physician in one of the largest prisons of Brazil, the Carandiru, in order to tackle the fearsome AIDS epidemics raging among male inmates. As a result of this experience, he wrote the best-seller book Estação Carandiru describing the harrowing life of the inmates, which later became a movie picture (Carandiru, directed by Hector Babenco), both winning accolades from the public and specialised national and international critics.

As the chairman of a cancer research institute at Universidade Paulista, Varella presently heads a research program on the potential of Brazilian Amazon medicinal plants for treating neoplasms and antibiotic-resistant bacteria. This research is supported by the São Paulo Research Support Foundation.

Science writing
Varella is also very active in the public understanding of science, particularly in the medical area. He writes columns for the largest Brazilian newspapers and was invited by the Globo TV Network to host a series of programs on the human body, the brain, first aid, smoking, pregnancy, obesity and others, which were exhibited at the Fantástico show on Sundays. He is also the producer and host of a TV talk show on medicine and health, which is broadcast on several TV channels.

For his work as a writer, Varella received several prizes and awards, among them the Prêmio Jabuti from the Brazilian Book Chamber, the International Book Fair of Bologna, Bologna, Italy, and The International Book Biennal of Rio de Janeiro (2001).

He has also written fiction for adults and children and often a vocal supporter of scientific skepticism.

Works
 Carcereiros (2012)
 AIDS Hoje. In 3 volumes, in collaboration with Antonio Fernando Varella and Narciso Escaleira.
 Estação Carandiru (1999), Companhia das Letras.
 Macacos, Publifolha ("Folha Explica" series)
 Nas ruas do Brás. Companhia das Letrinhas (children's book)
 De braços para o alto. Companhia das Letrinhas (children's book)
 Florestas do Rio Negro. With Alexandre Adalardo de Oliveira and Douglas C. Daly
 Maré - Vida na Favela
 Casa das Palavras, with Paola Berenstein, Ivaldo Bertazzo and Pedro Seiblitz (images).
 Por um fio. Companhia das Letras, 2004.

References

External links
 Professional website.  (in Portuguese).
 more info (English)

1943 births
Living people
Brazilian oncologists
Brazilian science writers
Brazilian people of Portuguese descent
Brazilian people of Spanish descent
University of São Paulo alumni
Brazilian skeptics
Brazilian atheists
Prison physicians
Brazilian columnists
Carandiru Penitentiary